Zvonimir "Rale" Rasic OAM (/Zvonimir Rale Rašić; born 26 December 1935) is an Australian former association football player, coach and media personality.

Playing career

Club
Born in Dole, Littoral Banovina, Kingdom of Yugoslavia (now Bosnia and Herzegovina) Rasic begin his career playing in Yugoslav clubs. Also known as Zvonko Rasic, Zvonko being a usual diminutive for Zvonimir, he played with FK Proleter Zrenjanin, FK Vojvodina, FK Spartak Subotica and FK Borac Banja Luka.  He migrated to Australia in 1962, but returned to Yugoslavia after 18 months to serve in the army. His obligations met, Rasic returned to Australia, and played football in the Victorian league.

Managerial career
He revolutionised the game in Australia, he was appointed coach in 1970 at just 34 years of age, and in 1974, he led the Australia national football team to the World Cup as coach.

After the World Cup, the Australian Soccer Federation sacked Rasic, replacing him with Englishman Brian Green. Rasic and others believe that he was dumped because he was not seen as being a real "Aussie." He has stated, "They took from me something that I was doing better than anyone else. I was a true-blue Aussie and nobody can deny that. I taught the players how to sing the national anthem."

He was a television presenter on SBS, during the Australian network's 2006 FIFA World Cup coverage. His biography, "The Rale Rasic Story," was published in 2006 by New Holland.

Honours 
Rasic was inducted into the Sport Australia Hall of Fame in 1989. In 2001, he was awarded the Australian Sports Medal and the Centenary Medal for "services to soccer" and in 2004 the Medal of the Order of Australia for "service to soccer as a player, coach and administrator."

References

External links 
 https://web.archive.org/web/20071009172011/http://www.theworldgame.com.au/aussiesabroad/index.php?pid=st&cid=69925
 http://www.insidesport.com.au/is/index?pg=adrenalin&spg=alliknow/alliknow_rale_rasic.htm
 http://www.abc.net.au/rn/australiatalksback/stories/2006/1657496.htm
Interview with Ralé Rašić, 1974 Socceroos' coach
 http://www.mvrfc.com/rr.htm
 http://www.ozfootball.net/ark/Players/R/RB.html

1935 births
Living people
Sportspeople from Mostar
Serbs of Bosnia and Herzegovina
Australian people of Serbian descent
Yugoslav emigrants to Australia
Bosnia and Herzegovina emigrants to Australia
Association football defenders
Yugoslav footballers
FK Proleter Zrenjanin players
FK Vojvodina players
FK Spartak Subotica players
FK Borac Banja Luka players
Footscray JUST players
Yugoslav First League players
Australian soccer coaches
Bosnia and Herzegovina football managers
Bosnia and Herzegovina expatriate football managers
Serbian football managers
Serbian expatriate football managers
1974 FIFA World Cup managers
Australia national soccer team managers
Marconi Stallions FC managers
Sydney Olympic FC managers
South Melbourne FC managers
APIA Leichhardt FC managers
Recipients of the Medal of the Order of Australia
Recipients of the Australian Sports Medal
Recipients of the Centenary Medal
Sport Australia Hall of Fame inductees
Australian television presenters